The Parliamentary Standing Committee on Defence (SCOD) is a department related standing committee (DRSC) of selected members of parliament, constituted by the Parliament of India, for the purpose of legislative oversight of the defence policies and decision making of the Ministry of Defence (MOD). It is one of the 24 DRSCs that have been mandated with the onerous task of ministry specific oversight.

The committee consists of thirty one members: twenty one elected from the Lok Sabha, the lower house of the Parliament, and not more than ten members from the Rajya Sabha, the upper house of the Parliament. The term of office of the members is one year and they are elected yearly from their respective houses according to the principle of proportional representation by means of single transferable vote. The chairperson is appointed by the Lok Sabha speaker.  A minister is not eligible to become a member of the committee and a member must relinquish their seat if they become a Minister.

The committee currently is headed by MP Kalraj Mishra, succeeding MP Maj Gen BC Khanduri (Retd.).

History 
Following the adoption of the Reports of Rules Committees of the 10th Lok Sabha by the two Houses on 29 March 1993, the way was paved for the setting up of the seventeen Departmentally Related Standing Committees(DRSCs) covering under their jurisdiction all the Ministries/Departments of the Union Government. Formally setup in April, 1993, the committee used to consist of 45 members— 30 nominated by the Speaker from amongst the members of Lok Sabha and 15 members nominated by the Chairman, Rajya Sabha from amongst the members of Rajya Sabha.

However, during the re-structuring of DRSCs in July, 2004 by the 14th Lok Sabha, the membership was reduced to 31 members—21 from Lok Sabha and 10 from Rajya Sabha.

The inaugural chairperson of the committee was Buta Singh, former Minister of Home Affairs (1984–86) and Minister of Consumer Affairs, Food and Public Distribution (1995-96) and a member of Indian National Congress.

Scope and Working

Functions 
The functions of the committee are stated as below :

 To consider the Demands for Grants of the Ministry of Defence (MOD) and make reports on the same which are to be tabled in both the houses.
 To examine such bills pertaining to the MOD as are referred to the Committee by the Speaker, Lok Sabha or the Chairman, Rajya Sabha.
 To consider annual report of the MOD.
 To consider national basic long-term policy documents presented to the Houses, if referred to the Committee by the Speaker, Lok Sabha or the Chairman, Rajya Sabha.

The Standing Committees shall not consider the matters of day-to-day administration of the department.

Working Procedures

Procedure relating to consideration of Demands for Grants 
After the general discussion on the Budget in the House is over, the Lok Sabha is adjourned for a fixed period. The Committee considers the Demands for Grants of the Ministry of Defence under its jurisdiction during the aforesaid period and present/lay reports. The Report on Demands for Grants does not suggest anything of the nature of cut motions. The Demands for Grants are considered by the House in the light of the Reports of the Committee

Procedure relating to consideration of Bills 
The Committee considers only such Bills introduced in either of the Houses as are referred to it by the Speaker, Lok Sabha or the Chairman, Rajya Sabha as the case may be. The Committee considers the general principles and clauses of the Bills referred to it and makes Reports thereon within the given time.

Current Composition 
Keys:          = 31 members

Comments in recent years

Rafale Fighter MMRCFA acquisition case (2013) 
The $8.9 billion deal for the purchase of 36 Rafale aircraft from France was delayed due to the Agusta Westland bribery scandal and a cautious stance taken by the government of India. The committee commented on the delay saying -  "The committee are unhappy to note that although a considerable time has elapsed, negotiations with France on Rafale (fighter aircraft) could not be taken to a logical end".

“The committee takes serious view of the fact that our squadron strength is already short of what has been authorized by the Government and moreover, insufficiency in number of available pilots in the Air Force further deteriorates our operational capabilities,” said the parliament panel headed by Major General (retd.) B.C Khanduri.

Surgical Strikes(2016) 
After initial reluctance, the army briefed members of the SCOD during October 2016. One of the members said - “A brief statement was made by the army on the sensitive issue. But no questions were taken”. However, this statement was countered by the statement issued by minority members MP Ambika Soni and MP Madhusudhan Mistry - “The decision not to brief the committee over surgical strikes under the garb of secrecy only amounts to ‘lack of confidence’ in the Members of Parliament, who are in the committee and who are bound by the oath of secrecy. This position is absolutely unacceptable to us".

Operational Preparedness (2015-2018) 
During April of 2015, SCOD highlighted for the first time the disturbing state of defence.  In its seventh and eighth report on Demands of Grants, the SCOD said that while the sanctioned strength was 42, Indian Air Force at present has 35 active squadrons - "With regard to this, representatives of air force deposed before the committee that a drawdown has already begun and, by 2022, air force will have around just 25 squadrons, thereby losing even the slight edge over rival neighbouring nation" , the panel additionally said in the same report, that IAF would need 45 squadrons to counter "two front collusive threat".

During March 2018 deposition of Vice Chief of Army Staff Sarath Chand, it was stated that - "Funds allocated is insufficient and the army is finding it difficult to even stock arms, ammunition, spares for 10 day intensive war. All the three services are expected to be prepared for at least 10 days of intense battle." Following this testimony, the defence minister, Ms. Nirmala Sitharam said that Ministry of Defence (MOD) has been trying to shore up all the shortages however the forces would have to prioritize and rationalize. However the SCOD recommended and the government via the Ministry of Defence (MOD) followed up eventually by increasing the financial powers of all three vice chiefs up to

Chairpersons

Chairpersons of the committee (1993-till date)

Reports published 
As part of its oversight process the committee has published quite a number of reports over the course of its existence. The committee has published a total of 87 reports from 1993 to 2010. Out of these, 18 are reports on Demands for Grants (DFGs), 25 reports on subjects taken up by the committee, 5 reports on bills referred to the committee and 36 are reports on action taken by the government on corresponding reports of the committee.

See also 

 17th Lok Sabha
 Estimates Committee
 Committee on Public Undertakings
 Public Accounts Committee (India)
 Standing Committee on Home Affairs
 Standing Committee on Finance
 List of Indian parliamentary committees

References

External links 

 Rules of Procedure and Conduct of Business in Lok Sabha 2014
 Lok Sabha - Estimates committee homepage
Demands for grants (2015-2016) Navy and Air force (demand nos. 24 and 25)
Demands for grants (2015-2016) Army (demand no. 23)
41st Report - Demands for grants (2017-2018) Army, Navy & Air Force (demand no. 20)

Committees of the Parliament of India
Ministry of Defence (India)
Indian Army
India